The 2016 Elite League was the 82nd season of the top division of speedway leagues in Great Britain. The Elite League ran between March and October 2016. The Poole Pirates were the defending champions after winning their third consecutive title in 2015. The lineup of teams for 2016 stayed the same as in 2015, with the same eight teams competing. It was the last time that the competition would be known as the Elite League.

Regulation changes
At the annual Elite League AGM, which was held during October and November 2015, it was announced that speedway bosses would continue to give more opportunities to young talent. All 8 Elite League teams would continue to track two young British draft riders, who would start the season at reserve. However unlike recent years these riders would be given Elite League averages after four meetings, giving them the chance to move into the top five of the team if they performed well. As a result of the reserve riders being given averages the overall points limit that teams must adhere to was raised from 34 to 40.5. In February 2016, it was announced that Elite League teams could sign an eighth stand-in rider, who could race in positions 2 to 5. The rider must be foreign and new to the Elite League. Lakeside Hammers signed Dennis Jonsson as their eight rider for the season.

Teams

Results
Teams faced each other four times: twice home and away. The first of the home and away meetings were called the 'A' fixtures, and the second were the 'B' fixtures.

'A' Fixtures

'B' Fixtures

Final league table
 Leicester Vs King's Lynn (B Fixture) was not raced

Elite League play-offs

Draw

Semi-finals

Grand final

Final Leading averages

Riders and final averages
Belle Vue Aces

 7.48
 7.37
 7.08
 6.59
 5.95
 5.82
 5.14

Source:

Coventry Bees

 7.91
  6.58
 7.22
 6.00
 4.80
 4.76
 4.65
 4.54
 3.81

Source:

King's Lynn Stars

 9.04
 7.08
 6.04
 5.47
 5.26
 5.12
 5.00
 4.99
 4.15
 3.67
 3.47

Rory Schlein replaced Mads Korneliussen on 7 July in the King's Lynn Stars team.
Nicklas Porsing replaced Rory Schlein on 1 September in the King's Lynn Stars team.

Lakeside Hammers

 8.45
 7.16
 6.88
 6.09
 6.00
 5.83
 5.20
 4.80
 3.65

Source:

Leicester Lions

 6.36
 6.22
 5.91
  5.67
 5.45
 5.40
 4.94
 4.90
 4.69
 3.52

Source:
Aaron Summers replaced Grzegorz Walasek on 12 April in the Leicester Lions team.
Davey Watt replaced Sebastian Ułamek on 11 May in the Leicester Lions team.
Ludvig Lindgren replaced Davey Watt on 13 June in the Leicester Lions team.

Poole Pirates

 8.95
 7.15
 6.91
 6.80
 6.02
 6.44
 5.60
 5.52

Source:
Bjarne Pedersen replaced Davey Watt on 26 April in the Poole Pirates team.
Antonio Lindbäck replaced Hans Andersen on 19 September in the Poole Pirates team.

Swindon Robins

 9.58
 6.41
 6.05
 5.95
 5.43
 4.84
 3.67

Source:

Wolverhampton Wolves

 8.41
 7.21
 7.18
 7.06
 6.68
 6.26
 5.91
 5.13
 4.15
 2.81

Source:
Peter Karlsson replaced Mikkel Bech on 3 June in the Wolverhampton Wolves team.
Tai Woffinden replaced Joonas Kylmäkorpi on 11 August in the Wolverhampton Wolves team.

See also
List of United Kingdom Speedway League Champions

Notes

References

SGB Premiership
Elite League
Elite